autour de lucie, an album by the French band Autour de Lucie, was released in 2004 on the Le Village Vert label.

Track listing
 "Noyés dans la masse" – 4:31
 "Nos vies limitrophes" – 3:29
 "Personne n'est comme toi" – 3:12
 "Avril en octobre" – 4:06
 "Sans moi" – 2:47
 "Dans quel pays" – 3:56
 "Femme à l'eau de vie" – 3:33
 "Mon toujours partant" – 3:32
 "La grande évasion" – 3:44
 "Guiding hands" – 3:52
 "Les homme peuvent être" – 6:04

References
 

Autour de Lucie albums
2004 albums